Monsieur Lecoq is a 1914 French silent mystery film directed by Maurice Tourneur and starring Harry Baur.

Plot 
Monsieur Lecoq, a policeman, is investigating a murder case. He will discover that it was in fact a case of blackmail involving the Duke and Duchess of Sairmuse.

Cast
In alphabetical order
 Harry Baur 
 Maurice de Féraudy 
 Charles Krauss 
 Jules Mondos 
 Fernande Petit 
 Polaire
 Henry Roussel 
 Georges Tréville

References

Bibliography
 Waldman, Harry. Maurice Tourneur: The Life and Films. McFarland, 2001.

External links

1914 films
Films directed by Maurice Tourneur
French silent short films
French mystery films
Films based on French novels
Films based on mystery novels
French black-and-white films
1910s mystery films
1914 short films
Silent mystery films
1910s French films